Lake Innisfree (also known as Lake Isle or Interlaken, and originally as Reservoir No. 1) is a man-made lake and former reservoir in the city of New Rochelle, in Westchester County, New York. The lake is located along the border of the neighboring town of  Eastchester, and its eastern end abuts the Hutchinson River Parkway. The lake takes its name from the poem Lake Isle of Innisfree by W. B. Yeats.

Overview
The area surrounding the lake was once rolling woodland owned in large sections by farmers in the 1700-1800s. The New Rochelle Water Company then bought up the land using it as a watershed for the lake served as the water supply source for Upper Rochelle during late 19th & early 20th centuries.

Constructed in 1885, the reservoir is impounded by the New Rochelle Reservoir #1 Dam on the Hutchinson River. The dam is masonry and of earthen construction, with a height of 34 feet and a length of 680 feet. The water surface covers an area of about 65 acres and the capacity is about 271,700,000 gallons. It has a maximum discharge of 744 cubic feet per second and drains an area of 2.2 square miles.

The water from this reservoir flows by gravity to the southern, low level district of the city. There is a steel equalizing tank 34 feet high by 44 feet in diameter connected with this system on high ground 2 miles south of the dam. The dam, which impounded 300 million gallons of water, cost $60,000 to build. While at first, the water supplied New Rochelle exclusively, two additional dams were constructed so that the water could also be routed to Pelham, Eastchester, and elsewhere.

The reservoir was named Lake Innisfree in the 1930s by the developer of the adjacent Interlaken Cooperative. The same developer constructed a sandy beach for recreation.

See also 

 History of New Rochelle, New York

References

 [Assembly of the State of New York] (1914). Documents of the Assembly of the State of New York, Volume 41. 

Innisfree
Geography of New Rochelle, New York